was originally laid down as ARD-18, a non self-propelled United States Navy Auxiliary floating drydock in 1944. Built by the Pacific Bridge Company in Alameda, California. During World War II USS ARD-18 was assigned to the Asiatic-Pacific Theater and serviced ships at Guadalcanal, Ulithi, and Leyte-Samar Naval Base. After the war, floating dry dock ARD-18 was sent to Norfolk Shipbuilding and Drydock Corp.'s yard, circa 1967-68 and was lengthened by adding a  midsection as well as an additional deck above the uppermost crane deck. Redesignated Medium Auxiliary Repair Dry Dock Endurance (ARDM-3), she served until retirement in 1995.

References
  NavSource Online: Service Ship Photo Archive Endurance (ARDM-3) ex USS ARD-18

 

1944 ships
Ships built in Alameda, California
ARD-12-class floating drydocks
Floating drydocks of the United States Navy